Flower of Revenge is a 2013 South Korean television series starring Jang Shin-young, Kang Kyung-joon, Seo Do-young, Sa Hee, Jung Ji-yoon, and Lee Won-suk. It was the very first daily drama broadcast by cable channel jTBC, and it aired from February 4 to August 1, 2013 on Mondays to Fridays at 20:15 (KST) time slot for 120 episodes.

Synopsis
Jeon Se-mi (Jang Shin-young) was once a pure and innocent girl. But that all changes when she is betrayed by her lover, loses her family, and raped. Her traumatic past pushes her on a path of vengeance against the people who wronged her and made her life into shambles.

Cast

Main
 Jang Shin-young as Jeon Se-mi / Jennifer Dyer Mason / Choi Seo-yeon
 Kang Kyung-joon as Kang Hyuk-min
 Seo Do-young as Park Nam-joon
 Sa Hee as Kang Ji-min 
 Jung Ji-yoon as Chun Soo-ji
 Lee Won-suk as Baek Seo-won

Supporting

 Kim Byung-choon as Kang Joo-chul
Hyuk-min's father.
 Cha Hwa-yeon as Min Hwa-young
Hyuk-min's mother.
 Kim Kwon as Kang Sung-min
Hyuk-min's younger brother.
 Choi Woo-suk as Yoo Je-joon
Se-mi's ex, Ji-min's husband.
 Kim Ji-young as Nam-joon's grandmother.
 Lee Deok-hee as Lee Jin-sook
Nam-joon's mother.
 Yoo Ah-mi as Park Sun-young
Nam-joon's aunt.
 Kim Kyung-sook as Mrs. Hyun
Soo-ji's mother.
 Ahn Suk-hwan as Baek Doo-jin
Seo-won's father.
 Park Jin-joo as Park Nam-hee
Nam-joon's young sister.
 Kim Kwon as Kang Sung-min
Hyun-min's young brother.
 Kang Ye-seo as Yoo Ye-ji
Ji-min's daughter.
 Lee Chul-min as Kim Baek-choon
 Kim Young-bae as Detective Seo

Special appearances
 Kang Shin-il as Mr. Jeon
Se-mi's father.
 Kim Chung as Mrs. Hong
Se-mi's mother.

References

External links
  
 

2013 South Korean television series debuts
2013 South Korean television series endings
JTBC television dramas
Korean-language television shows
Television series about revenge
South Korean melodrama television series
Television series by Drama House